Rhyncogonini is a weevil tribe in the subfamily Entiminae.

Genera 
Microgonus – Psomeles – Rhyncogonus

References 

 Sharp, D. 1919: Studies in Rhynchophora. 4. An aberrant new genus and tribe from New Guinea. Entomologist's Monthly Magazine, 55(7): 151–153.
 Alonso-Zarazaga, M.A.; Lyal, C.H.C. 1999: A world catalogue of families and genera of Curculionoidea (Insecta: Coleoptera) (excepting Scolytidae and Platypodidae). Entomopraxis, Barcelona.

External links 

Entiminae
Beetle tribes